The Ballad of Abu Ghraib is a nonfiction book by American writer Philip Gourevitch. The book originally appeared in hardback under the title Standard Operating Procedure.

References

External links 
 The Guardian
 The LA Times
 The New York Times
 Errol Morris interviews Philip Gourevitch

2008 non-fiction books
American non-fiction books
Books about the 2003 invasion of Iraq
Abu Ghraib torture and prisoner abuse
Penguin Books books